Nicholas or Nick Green may refer to:
Nicholas St. John Green (1830–1876), American philosopher and lawyer
Sir Nicholas Green (judge) (born 1958), British Lord Justice of Appeal
Nick Green (rower) (born 1967), Australian Olympic rower
Nick Green (baseball) (born 1978), American baseball infielder
Shooting of Nicholas Green (1987–1994), American child killed in a shooting in Italy
Nick Green (writer), Canadian playwright